The Goa women's football team is an Indian women's football team representing Goa in the Senior Women's National Football Championship. They have reached the semi-finals of the Senior Women's National Football Championship four times at the 2004–05, 2005–06, 2006–07 and 2007–08 editions.

Goa's junior team were the champions of the inaugural Junior Girl's National Football Championship 2001–02 held at Goa.

Honours
 Junior Girl's National Football Championship
 Winners (1): 2001–02

References

Women's football teams in India
Football in Goa